Frank Eusebio Maestrone (December 20, 1922 – May 22, 2007) served as United States Ambassador to Kuwait from 1976 to 1979. Born in Springfield, Massachusetts, he eventually retired to San Diego, California. In his retirement, he served as a board member of the San Diego World Affairs Council.

Maestrone died on May 22, 2007, after a brief infection.

References

1922 births
2007 deaths
Ambassadors of the United States to Kuwait
Infectious disease deaths in California